Jameh Mosque of Takab dates back to the Qajar dynasty and is located in Takab, Imam Khomeini Street.

Sources 

Mosques in Iran
Mosque buildings with domes
National works of Iran
Takab